The Soccer Ashes was a soccer trophy contested by Australia and New Zealand between the 1920s and 1950s.

History
The concept of awarding a trophy made of ashes was inspired by the Ashes urn awarded to the winner of series between Australia and England in cricket.

The Soccer Ashes were created after New Zealand defeated Australia in a series in 1923. The ashes consisted of the remains of cigars smoked by the two captains, Alec Gibb (Australia) and George Campbell (New Zealand). The ashes were encased in a razor case used by a New Zealand soldier during the Gallipoli campaign during World War I. The case was then set in wood from both countries.

See also

Trans-Tasman Cup
Australia–New Zealand soccer rivalry

References

Australian soccer trophies and awards
Association football cup competitions in New Zealand
Sports rivalries in Australia
Sports rivalries in New Zealand
The Ashes
Australia–New Zealand sports relations